San Quintin, officially the Municipality of San Quintin, is a 3rd class municipality in the province of Pangasinan, Philippines. According to the 2020 census, it has a population of 33,980 people.

Geography

Barangays
San Quintin is politically subdivided into 21 barangays. These barangays are headed by elected officials: Barangay Captain, Barangay Council, whose members are called Barangay Councilors. All are elected every three years.

Climate

Demographics

Economy

Government
San Quintin, belonging to the sixth congressional district of the province of Pangasinan, is governed by a mayor designated as its local chief executive and by a municipal council as its legislative body in accordance with the Local Government Code. The mayor, vice mayor, and the councilors are elected directly by the people through an election which is being held every three years.

Elected officials

References

External links

 San Quintin Profile at PhilAtlas.com
  Municipal Profile at the National Competitiveness Council of the Philippines
 San Quintin at the Pangasinan Government Website
 Local Governance Performance Management System
 [ Philippine Standard Geographic Code]
 Philippine Census Information

Municipalities of Pangasinan